Australia participated in the Junior Eurovision Song Contest 2019 which was held in Gliwice, Poland. The Australian broadcaster ABC was responsible for choosing their entry for the contest. Jordan Anthony was internally selected to represent Australia in Poland.

Background

Prior to the 2018 Contest, Australia had participated in the Junior Eurovision Song Contest since 2015. On 1 September 2019, it was announced that Jordan Anthony had been internally chosen by the broadcaster to represent Australia. Rabbone (born 17 December 2004) had previously, at the age of 14, auditioned for the eighth season of The Voice Australia, where he was mentored by Delta Goodrem and finished in fourth place. His songs for the Junior Eurovision Song Contest 2019 was "We Will Rise".

At Junior Eurovision
During the opening ceremony and the running order draw which both took place on 18 November 2019, Australia was drawn to perform first on 24 November 2019, preceding France.

Voting

Detailed voting results

References

Junior Eurovision Song Contest
Australia
Junior